Valerio Perentin (12 July 1909 in Izola, Austria-Hungary – 7 January 1998) was an Italian rower who competed in the 1928 Summer Olympics and in the 1936 Summer Olympics.

In 1928 he won the gold medal as member of the Italian boat in the coxed four event. Eight years later he was part of the Italian boat which was eliminated in the repechage of the coxed four competition.

References

External links
 profile

1909 births
1998 deaths
People from Izola
Italian male rowers
Olympic rowers of Italy
Rowers at the 1928 Summer Olympics
Rowers at the 1936 Summer Olympics
Olympic gold medalists for Italy
Olympic medalists in rowing
Medalists at the 1928 Summer Olympics
European Rowing Championships medalists